Anton Hofherr (born 20 December 1947) is a German ice hockey player. He competed in the men's tournament at the 1972 Winter Olympics.

References

1947 births
Living people
German ice hockey players
Olympic ice hockey players of West Germany
Ice hockey players at the 1972 Winter Olympics
Sportspeople from Garmisch-Partenkirchen